Megha is a 2014 Indian Tamil language romantic thriller film written and directed by Karthik Rishi, a former associate of Subramaniam Siva. Jointly produced by Albert James and S. Selvakumar, the film stars Ashwin Kakumanu, Srushti Dange and Angana Roy, while Jayaprakash, Ravi Prakash, Aadukalam Naren, Meera Krishnan, and Nithya make up the supporting cast. The film's soundtrack and background score were composed by Ilaiyaraaja. The film released on 29 August 2014. This film was a success at the box office with songs of the film being praised.

Plot

Mugilan (Ashwin Kakumanu) is a lovable and kind middle-class man who works as a forensic officer. He falls in love with Meghavathy Srinivasan aka Megha (Srushti Dange), who comes from a rich family background. Megha slowly starts developing feelings for him, and one day she finally reciprocates his love. But later, she also mysteriously disappears on the same day; the reason being is that Mugil's work leads him to incriminating evidence against Joseph Fernando (Aadukalam Naren), the police officer who is touted to be the next Police Commissioner of Chennai. Joseph had murdered Officer Raghavan (Vijayakumar), as he had considered him a threat to his promotion, but discovers that Mugil is on his tracks, hence Joseph tries to frame Mugil for murder and rape of Megha. Now it's up to Mugil to find his love. Their love undergoes many twists and turns, but how they reunite forms the rest of the story.

Cast

 Ashwin Kakumanu as  Mugilan (Mugil)	
 Srushti Dange as Meghavathy Srinivasan (Megha)
 Angana Roy as Thulasi
 Aadukalam Naren as Joseph Fernando
 Vijayakumar as Officer R. Raghavan
 Jayaprakash as Jayakumar
 Sashikumar Subramani as Mani
 Ravi Prakash as Srinivasan
 Nithya as Mugilan's mother
 Sai Prashanth as Mugilan's friend
 Yuvina Parthavi as Yuvi
 Meera Krishnan as Megha's mother
 Munishkanth as Joseph Fernando's henchmen
 Y. G. Mahendran
 Ramdoss as Mugil's friend
 S. Selvakumar
Shamili Sukumar as Megha's Friend

Soundtrack
The film's soundtrack was composed by Ilaiyaraaja. The album features seven tracks, one of which was "Putham Pudhu Kaalai" from the film Alaigal Oivathillai which was remastered in this film. In an interview, Purushothaman, a long time associate of Ilaiyaraaja revealed that "Putham Pudhu Kaalai" was originally recorded for the film "Maruthani" supposed to be directed by Mahendran. The movie was never made and the song was made as part of the Alaigal Oivathillai LP Record. Ilaiyaraaja himself had sung two songs in the film and his son Yuvan Shankar Raja had rendered two songs. Ilaiyaraaja stated that he agreed to compose the music since he liked the story and the screenplay. Apart from "Puthum Pudhu Kaalai", the lyrics for other songs were written by Na. Muthukumar and Palani Bharathi.

The music was well received by critics. The New Indian Express called Ilaiyaraja's songs and the score "the film's strength", and Sify wrote, "Ilaiyaraaja owns most of scenes in the movie with his background score and is indeed a backbone for propelling the narration in the screenplay".

Critical reception
The New Indian Express wrote, "The pace of the movie is too leisurely for a crime thriller. Also, not much importance is given to the crafting of the investigation episodes as has been given to the romantic interludes. One can feel a sense of imbalance in the narration as it shifts from one to the other". Behindwoods.com gave 2.25 stars out of 5 and wrote, "Gurudev's camera captures the beauty of rain in its majestic splendor which becomes the major highlight of the film. Karthik Rishi’s   product is further strengthened by Ilayaraja’s scores and background tracks. However, the director scrambles to tilt these two major positives to his story's favor. Megha also wobbles weakly between the genres of romance and thriller resulting in a neither here nor there feeling for the viewer". Only Kollywood wrote, "Megha is a romantic thriller solely riding on the shoulders of Ilaiyaraja’s exhilarating background score. It has a wafer-thin, done-to-death plot which demanded a much better writing to make the audiences sit through the film".

Sify gave a more positive review, writing, "Megha is an attempt that stands out from the run-of-the-mill template with an innovative screenplay".

References

External links 
 

2014 films
Films scored by Ilaiyaraaja
2010s Tamil-language films
Fictional portrayals of the Tamil Nadu Police
Forensic science in popular culture
Murder in films